Gyaritus is a genus of longhorn beetles of the subfamily Lamiinae, containing the following species:

subgenus Axinyllium
 Gyaritus varius (Pascoe, 1864)

subgenus Gyaritus
 Gyaritus affinis Breuning, 1938
 Gyaritus auratus Breuning, 1963
 Gyaritus aurescens Breuning, 1940
 Gyaritus bangueyensis Breuning, 1958
 Gyaritus cinnamomeus Pascoe, 1864
 Gyaritus fulvopictus Pascoe, 1864
 Gyaritus fuscosignatus Breuning & de Jong, 1941
 Gyaritus gahani Breuning, 1938
 Gyaritus giganteus Breuning, 1938
 Gyaritus hamatus Pascoe, 1858
 Gyaritus indicus Breuning, 1938
 Gyaritus javanicus Breuning & de Jong, 1941
 Gyaritus malaccensis Breuning, 1938
 Gyaritus quadridentatus (Pic, 1936)
 Gyaritus siamensis Breuning, 1950
 Gyaritus spinosus Breuning, 1939
 Gyaritus viduus (Pascoe, 1886)

References

Gyaritini